Roberto "Beto" Avila (born October 16, 2000) is an American professional soccer player who plays as a forward for Major League Soccer club Houston Dynamo.

Career

Austin Bold 
On April 22, 2019, Avila signed an academy contract with USL Championship side Austin Bold. He made his debut for Austin on May 14, coming off the bench in a 2–0 win over the Tulsa Roughnecks in an Open Cup match. On August 17, he made his league debut, coming on as a substitute in a 5–1 win vs Tulsa.  Austin qualified for the playoffs after finishing 2nd in the Western Conference, but Avila did not appear in either of Austin's 2 playoff games.

On September 5, 2020, Avila scored his first goal for Austin in a 1–1 draw against Tulsa.  In a shortened 2020 season due to the COVID-19 pandemic, Avila appeared in 10 of Austin's 16 games, making 3 starts and scoring 2 goals.

On June 14, 2021, Avila joined Canadian Premier League side FC Edmonton on loan.  He made his debut for Edmonton on June 26, coming on as a substitute in a 1–0 loss to Atlético Ottawa.  In August, after making 6 appearances for Edmonton, Avila was recalled by Austin.  He scored his first goal of the season on August 23, helping Austin to a 1–1 draw against New Mexico United.  Avila ended the season with 18 appearances and 2 goals for Austin.

Houston Dynamo 
On February 17, 2022, Avila signed with MLS Next Pro side Houston Dynamo 2, the reserve team of MLS club Houston Dynamo.  After a strong start to the season for Dynamo 2, Avila made his debut for the first team on April 19, setting up Sam Junqua in the 90+3rd minute to give Houston a 2–1 over RIo Grande Valley FC in an Open Cup match.  On May 6, Avila signed a first team contract with the Dynamo.  He made his MLS debut on May 14, coming off the bench in a 2–0 win against Nashville SC.  Avila ended the year with 11 first team appearances, 8  as a sub in MLS plus 3 appearances in the Open Cup, while also scoring 6 goals and recording 4 assists in 14 games with Dynamo 2.

Career statistics
As of February 24, 2023

References

External links

Profile at Austin Bold Official Website
USL profile

Living people
2000 births
Association football forwards
Association football midfielders
American soccer players
Austin Bold FC players
FC Edmonton players
USL Championship players
Canadian Premier League players
People from Williamson County, Texas
Soccer players from Texas
American sportspeople of Mexican descent
American expatriate soccer players
Expatriate soccer players in Canada
American expatriate sportspeople in Canada
Houston Dynamo FC players
Major League Soccer players
MLS Next Pro players